Sudhir (born 27 October 1994) is an Indian Para powerlifter. He won the gold medal at the 2022 Commonwealth Games.

He is a six-time Indian national champion in para powerlifting and was also a bronze medalist at the 2018 Asian Para Games.

References

1994 births
Living people
Indian powerlifters
Powerlifters at the 2022 Commonwealth Games
Commonwealth Games gold medallists for India
Commonwealth Games medallists in powerlifting
20th-century Indian people
21st-century Indian people
Medallists at the 2022 Commonwealth Games